Midnight DJ is a Filipino reality drama-horror-action-thriller television series starring Paolo Contis and Oyo Boy Sotto, who works as DJ at night and at the same time he works to find solutions to the action paranormal problems of his listeners. The series debuted in 2008 on TV5, catch it re-run airing from TV5, every Thursday night at 8:30 PM on PHTV UHF Channel 23 in Metro Manila.

Episode list

Season 1: August 11, 2008 - November 3, 2008 
Season 1 introduces us to the Midnight DJ team. Midnight DJ is a weekly radio show hosted by Patrick (Paolo Contis), the midnight dj who's got an open third eye. Other members of the Midnight DJ team include Andrea (Desiree del Valle), the show's producer and Bodjie (Joaqui Tupas), the team's driver and camera man. The Midnight crew is managed by Trixie (Jenny Miller).

Together the team solve cases submitted by avid listeners of the radio show. At the end of the season 1, Patrick dies while solving another mystery.

Season 2: November 22, 2008 - February 21, 2009  
Six months have passed. LXFM ratings have gone down, and Trixie knows that the only way to bring them up is to revive their top rated program, Midnight DJ.
 
Andrea, still heartbroken over the loss of Midnight DJ's previous host, Patrick (Paolo Contis), has just been promoted from Producer to Programming Director, by Trixie, and her daunting first task as the boss is to fill the shoes of Patrick.

Season 3: February 28, 2009 - May 30, 2009

Season 4: June 6, 2009 - September 5, 2009

Season 5:  September 12, 2009 - December 12, 2009

Season 6: December 19, 2009 - March 13, 2010

Season 7: March 20, 2010 - June 18, 2010

Season 8: June 25, 2010 - September 18, 2010

Season 9: September 25, 2010 - December 18, 2010

Season 10: December 25, 2010 - March 26, 2011

Season 11: April 2, 2011 - May 14, 2011

References

Lists of fantasy television series episodes
Lists of science fiction television series episodes
Lists of Philippine drama television series episodes